This article shows the rosters of all participating teams at the 2017 FIBA Women's Asia Cup in Bangalore, India.

Division A

Group A

China

Chinese Taipei

New Zealand

North Korea

Group B

Australia

Japan

Philippines

South Korea

Division B

Group A

India

Sri Lanka

Uzbekistan

Group B

Fiji

Kazakhstan

Lebanon

Singapore

References

External links 
 Official website

2017 in women's basketball
2017
FIBA Women's Asia Cup squads